"Perfect" is a song by American alternative rock band the Smashing Pumpkins. It was released as the second single from their fourth album, Adore (1998), on September 7, 1998. It was the final commercial single from the album, although "Crestfallen" and "To Sheila" were subsequently released as promotional singles.

Critical reception 
Upon release, the song received positive reviews. Rolling Stone notes that the song "picks up on the synth-pop echoes of the 1996 Pumpkins hit 1979." Feldman of website Musiccritic.com called the single "an irresistible slice of candy-coated pop" while website Rockmusicreview.com praised it for its "glimmering shine."

Music video 
To expand on the similarities between "Perfect" and "1979", the band released a music video which continued the story of the characters in "1979". They were able to find and use four out of the five original actors from the "1979" video, including Giuseppe Andrews. The fifth was in jail. The same crew of directors was hired, which consisted of husband-and-wife team Jonathan Dayton and Valerie Faris. It was the fifth and final collaboration between the two and the Smashing Pumpkins.

The conclusion of the video, in which a tape falls off a car and is crushed, is probably a reference to the fate of the first tapes of the "1979" music video, which had to be re-taped because they were left on the roof of a car and destroyed when the car drove off.

The video also contains footage of the band performing at The Masque in L.A. for selected fans. The set played at the taping included heavier songs the band was not performing during regular concerts at the time, such as "Where Boys Fear to Tread", "Bodies", and "Pug".

The video debuted on MTV's 120 Minutes on September 16, 1998.

Track listings 
All songs were written by Billy Corgan, except "Summer", written by James Iha. Drums provided by Joey Waronker.

Charts

Weekly charts

Year-end charts

Release history

References

External links 
 

The Smashing Pumpkins songs
1990s ballads
1998 singles
1998 songs
Hut Records singles
Music videos directed by Jonathan Dayton and Valerie Faris
Rock ballads
Song recordings produced by Billy Corgan
Song recordings produced by Flood (producer)
Songs written by Billy Corgan